"Go Off" is a song by British recording artist M.I.A. from her fifth studio album, AIM (2016). The track was written by M.I.A., Skrillex, and Blaqstarr. Production was handled by the latter two, alongside Tom Manaton. The song premiered on Annie Mac's eponymous radio show on 14 July 2016 and was self-released worldwide the following day as a digital download under exclusive license to Interscope Records. The track was met with mixed reviews.

Music video
The music video for the song was directed by M.I.A. herself. It only consists of a series of surface mining site explosions as M.I.A. has revealed she did not want to feature any human beings in the video.

Charts

Release history

References

2016 singles
2016 songs
Electronic songs
Interscope Records singles
M.I.A. (rapper) songs
Song recordings produced by Skrillex
Songs written by M.I.A. (rapper)
Songs written by Skrillex
Songs written by Blaqstarr